is cult filmmaker Shozin Fukui's 1996 follow-up to 964 Pinocchio. Like its predecessor, it is an underground Japanese cyberpunk film, shot in black and white.

Premise
Often interpreted as a prequel to 964 Pinocchio, Rubber's Lover details a clandestine group of scientists who conduct psychic experiments on human guinea pigs they take from the streets. Using brain-altering drugs, sensory deprivation and computer interfaces, they subject their patients to gruesome scientific tortures that often end in brutal death. After continued failure and pressure from the company to cancel the project, they pursue one last experiment using one of their own as a test subject - yielding dangerous results.

Similar works
Like Tetsuo: The Iron Man, it is filmed in stark black and white and set in a decayed postindustrial city. Like that film, it utilizes horror imagery.

References

External links

Rubber's Lover at rottentomatoes
Rubber's Lover Rubber’s Lover at horrordrome.com

1996 films
1990s science fiction films
Cyberpunk films
Japanese science fiction horror films
Japanese black-and-white films
Films directed by Shozin Fukui
1990s Japanese films